A bioptome is a small pincer-shaped cutting/grasping instrument used in medicine for taking endomyocardial biopsy specimens of the heart muscle following heart transplantation in rejection monitoring and for diagnosing some diseases of the heart.

Technique
It is flexible and usually operated under the guidance of fluoroscopy or echocardiography.

History
Since 1962, many modifications to the device and techniques in its use have been made.

References

Surgical instruments